The National Socialist Liberation Front (NSLF) was originally established as a youth wing of the National Socialist White People's Party in 1969. In 1974 it was reconstituted as a separate neo-Nazi organization after its leader Joseph Tommasi had been expelled by NSWPP leader Matt Koehl.

History 

The NSLF was established in 1969 by Tommasi, with the backing of William Luther Pierce, as a campus-based revolutionary organization to compete with New Left militant groups. Ideological as well as personal differences began to develop between Tommassi and Koehl. At the Party's second congress in 1970, Tommasi denounced the conservative old guard of the party and called for immediate revolution. Koehl expelled him from the Party in 1973, claiming that he was smoking marijuana and entertaining young women at party headquarters, as well as misusing party funds. One of the NSLF's recruits during this period was Louisiana State University student David Duke.

The NSLF was reconstituted as a new organization on March 2, 1974 "in the presence of 43 National Socialist revolutionaries" in El Monte, California. The NSLF broke with established Nazi tradition, eschewing brownshirt uniforms and abandoning attempts to raise a "mass movement" of supporters to win power through legal means. Instead, Tommasi argued that it was best for small bands of "National Socialist revolutionaries" to arm themselves and conduct guerrilla warfare. The new organization was structured with two tiers, a legal "aboveground" membership - which at most included forty members - and a smaller "underground" that was dedicated to violent, revolutionary action. This group included Tommasi, Karl Hand, David Rust and James Mason, the latter of whom was not an official member of the NSLF.

Joseph Tommasi was killed at the El Monte headquarters of the NSWPP in August 1975 and was succeeded by his lieutenant David Rust, who was soon arrested on a weapons charge. Units of the group were formed in Cincinnati, Buffalo, NY, Wilmington, Delaware and Louisiana. In 1982, James Mason took a splinter group to form the Universal Order, a group that promoted the ideas of Charles Manson as a continuation of Nazism, and took with them the periodical Siege!, though the parting was reportedly amicable. By that time Karl Hand headed the group and published Defiance. Under Hand, the NSLF went back to the earlier model of uniformed political demonstrations and legality. However, the organization would come to an end with Hand's arrest on a weapons charge in the mid-1980s.

Periodicals 
The National Socialist liberator Arlington, Va.: National Socialist Liberation Front, May 1969 – mid 1970s?
National Socialist review. Panorama City, Calif.: NSLF Jan 1975 – ?
Defiance Buffalo, N.Y.: M. Stachowski 1980 – 
Siege Chillicothe, Ohio: National Socialist Liberation Front, mid-1970s – 1982 (became publication of Universal Order)
National Socialist observer. Kenner, LA: NSLF, Sept. 1984 – ?
The future belongs to the few of us still willing to get our hands dirty NSLF poster

References

Notes

Citations

External links 
Terrorist incidents ascribed to the NSLF on the START terrorism database

Neo-Nazi organizations in the United States
Youth wings of political parties in the United States
Student wings of political parties in the United States
Student organizations established in 1969
1969 establishments in California
1980s disestablishments in the United States
White nationalism in California
Anti-capitalist organizations
Political youth organizations in the United States
Student political organizations in the United States
Youth wings of fascist parties